is a 2016 Japanese school science fiction action comedy film directed by Eiichirō Hasumi and written by Tatsuya Kanazawa. The film is a sequel to Assassination Classroom (2015), with both films based on the manga series of the same name written and illustrated by Yūsei Matsui. It was released in Japan by Toho on March 25, 2016.

Plot
It has been six months since the start of senior year, and yet the Class 3-E of Kunugigaoka High School has not been able to assassinate their tentacled teacher, Koro-sensei, who will blow up the Earth on graduation day. Due to the school festival to be held, assistant teacher Tadaomi Karasuma instructs the class to give all they got, since Koro-sensei will be distracted, making him an easy target of killing. Karasuma also insists that the class should assassinate Koro-sensei before the government-sponsored assassin Red Eye do the same. However, neither the students nor Red Eye are ultimately able to do the task, and Koro-sensei even convinces Red Eye to give up his job for the sake of his students.

At the end of the school festival, Kaede Kayano catches Koro-sensei off guard and begins her assault by revealing her tentacles. She reveals her true identity to be a child actress named Akari Yukimura and the younger sister of Aguri, the class' former teacher and the one whom Koro-sensei promised to teach the class for. She wants to take revenge against Koro-sensei for having supposedly killed her sister. Knowing that the experimental tentacles she is wearing are taxing her life force, Nagisa Shiota manages to calm her down. He distracts her with a kiss and disables the tentacles.

Koro-sensei then tells the class about his past: as a human, he was an assassin known as "the Reaper". Due to his strength and intelligence, two years ago, a rogue organization led by Dr. Kōtarō Yanagisawa took him as a second guinea pig (a mouse being used as the first) for the testing of a chemical capable of stimulating growth in plants. The Reaper was supervised by Yanagisawa's fiancée, Aguri, with whom he developed a close relationship, especially after she revealed her circumstances as a teacher. When Yanagisawa found out that the mouse tested on the Moon had destroyed it, he ordered the disposal of the Reaper before he could do the same to the Earth. Aguri prevented the execution but was mortally injured and died in the Reaper's arms; this action pulled the Reaper from succumbing to the madness his experimentation caused, leading him to make a vow to teach Class 3-E.

Nagisa decides to find an alternative besides killing Koro-sensei after hearing the story. Having to deal with several opponents, Karma Akabane included, on the plan, he compromises it by saying that should the plan fail, he will kill Koro-sensei himself. The class begin to work on an antidote mapped by a file Nagisa, Karma and Itona steal from Yanagisawa's labs. However, the government has planned to use a laser ignited by a satellite as a last resort to kill Koro-sensei. The government agents kidnap the class, but they manage to escape with the help of Karasuma and Irina Jelavić.

However, to their dismay, the class find out that they have been tricked by Yanagisawa, as the stolen file was faked. Yanagisawa proceeds to inject artificial tentacles, transforming himself into a monstrous being. Seeing him easily defeating Koro-sensei, Akari attempts to defend him, only to get injured in the process. Angered at having to see a repeat of the tragedy two years before, Koro-sensei creates a bomb that obliterates Yanagisawa. He does a surgery that heals Akari, having developed it since his failure in saving Aguri, then tells the class that they should kill him soon. In tears, Nagisa volunteers for the task.

Several years later, Nagisa has become a teacher in a school for delinquents. A delinquent tries to intimidate him, which Nagisa responds by silently threatening him.

Cast

Ryosuke Yamada as Nagisa Shiota
Kazunari Ninomiya as Koro-sensei / The Reaper
Masaki Suda as Karma Akabane
Maika Yamamoto as Kaede Kayano / Akari Yukimura
Seika Taketomi as Rio Nakamura
Mio Yūki as Yukiko Kanzaki
Miku Uehara as Manami Okuda
Kanna Hashimoto as Autonomous Intelligence "Ritsu" Fixed Artillery
Seishiro Kato as Itona Horibe
Mirei Kiritani as Aguri Yukimura
Tsuyoshi Abe as Red Eye
Takeo Nakahara as Gōki Onaga
Kang Ji-young as Irina Jelavić
Hiroki Narimiya as Shiro / Kōtarō Yanagisawa
Kippei Shiina as Tadaomi Karasuma

Production
The film was announced in April 2015. The casting of Mirei Kiritani as Aguri Yukimura and Kazunari Ninomiya as the God of Death was announced in September 2015. The casting of Hiroki Narimiya as Kōtarō Yanagisawa was announced in December 2015 and the casting of Tsuyoshi Abe as Red Eye was announced in January 2016.

The theme song of the film is "Sayonara Sensation" by Hey! Say! JUMP's sub unit, Sensations.

Release
The release date of the film was announced in December 2015 for March 25, 2016. The film was released in Japan by Toho.

Reception

References

External links
 

2016 action comedy films
2010s Japanese films
2010s Japanese-language films
2010s monster movies
Assassination Classroom
Films about educators 
Films about teacher–student relationships
Films directed by Eiichirō Hasumi
Funimation
Japanese action comedy films
Japanese high school films
Japanese sequel films
Live-action films based on manga
Toho films
2010s science fiction comedy films
2016 science fiction action films
Films scored by Naoki Satō